The North West constituency (No.215) is a Russian legislative constituency in Saint Petersburg. It covers upscale northwestern Saint Petersburg as well as Kronshtadt.

Members elected

Election results

1993

|-
! colspan=2 style="background-color:#E9E9E9;text-align:left;vertical-align:top;" |Candidate
! style="background-color:#E9E9E9;text-align:left;vertical-align:top;" |Party
! style="background-color:#E9E9E9;text-align:right;" |Votes
! style="background-color:#E9E9E9;text-align:right;" |%
|-
|style="background-color:"|
|align=left|Aleksey Aleksandrov
|align=left|Independent
|
|18.21%
|-
|style="background-color:"|
|align=left|Vatanyar Yagya
|align=left|Independent
| -
|8.84%
|-
| colspan="5" style="background-color:#E9E9E9;"|
|- style="font-weight:bold"
| colspan="3" style="text-align:left;" | Total
| 
| 100%
|-
| colspan="5" style="background-color:#E9E9E9;"|
|- style="font-weight:bold"
| colspan="4" |Source:
|
|}

1995

|-
! colspan=2 style="background-color:#E9E9E9;text-align:left;vertical-align:top;" |Candidate
! style="background-color:#E9E9E9;text-align:left;vertical-align:top;" |Party
! style="background-color:#E9E9E9;text-align:right;" |Votes
! style="background-color:#E9E9E9;text-align:right;" |%
|-
|style="background-color:"|
|align=left|Anatoly Golov
|align=left|Yabloko
|
|13.99%
|-
|style="background-color:#DA2021"|
|align=left|Vyacheslav Shcherbakov
|align=left|Ivan Rybkin Bloc
|
|11.86%
|-
|style="background-color:#3A46CE"|
|align=left|Grigory Tomchin
|align=left|Democratic Choice of Russia – United Democrats
|
|11.64%
|-
|style="background-color:"|
|align=left|Aleksey Aleksandrov (incumbent)
|align=left|Our Home – Russia
|
|11.40%
|-
|style="background-color:#D50000"|
|align=left|Sergey Savchenko
|align=left|Communists and Working Russia - for the Soviet Union
|
|10.89%
|-
|style="background-color:#2C299A"|
|align=left|Anatoly Krivenchenko
|align=left|Congress of Russian Communities
|
|7.24%
|-
|style="background-color:#FF4400"|
|align=left|Viktor Sokolov
|align=left|Party of Workers' Self-Government
|
|3.68%
|-
|style="background-color:"|
|align=left|Yelena Babich
|align=left|Liberal Democratic Party
|
|2.98%
|-
|style="background-color:"|
|align=left|Aleksandr Makarov
|align=left|Independent
|
|2.48%
|-
|style="background-color:#1C1A0D"|
|align=left|Nadezhda Pashkovskaya
|align=left|Forward, Russia!
|
|2.24%
|-
|style="background-color:"|
|align=left|Valery Pankratov
|align=left|Independent
|
|2.23%
|-
|style="background-color:#F21A29"|
|align=left|Sergey Tsvetkov
|align=left|Trade Unions and Industrialists – Union of Labour
|
|2.17%
|-
|style="background-color:#FE4801"|
|align=left|Aleksandr Shanurenko
|align=left|Pamfilova–Gurov–Lysenko
|
|1.59%
|-
|style="background-color:"|
|align=left|Aleksandr Dugin
|align=left|Independent
|
|0.85%
|-
|style="background-color:"|
|align=left|Vyacheslav Chernyshev
|align=left|Independent
|
|0.70%
|-
|style="background-color:"|
|align=left|Yevgeny Zaytsev
|align=left|Independent
|
|0.31%
|-
|style="background-color:#00A200"|
|align=left|Aleksandr Deyanov
|align=left|Transformation of the Fatherland
|
|0.28%
|-
|style="background-color:#000000"|
|colspan=2 |against all
|
|11.33%
|-
| colspan="5" style="background-color:#E9E9E9;"|
|- style="font-weight:bold"
| colspan="3" style="text-align:left;" | Total
| 
| 100%
|-
| colspan="5" style="background-color:#E9E9E9;"|
|- style="font-weight:bold"
| colspan="4" |Source:
|
|}

1999
A by-election was scheduled after Against all line received the most votes.

|-
! colspan=2 style="background-color:#E9E9E9;text-align:left;vertical-align:top;" |Candidate
! style="background-color:#E9E9E9;text-align:left;vertical-align:top;" |Party
! style="background-color:#E9E9E9;text-align:right;" |Votes
! style="background-color:#E9E9E9;text-align:right;" |%
|-
|style="background-color:"|
|align=left|Anatoly Golov (incumbent)
|align=left|Yabloko
|
|14.77%
|-
|style="background-color:#3B9EDF"|
|align=left|Aleksandr Neshitov
|align=left|Fatherland – All Russia
|
|13.64%
|-
|style="background-color:"|
|align=left|Konstantin Sevenard
|align=left|Independent
|
|13.59%
|-
|style="background-color:#1042A5"|
|align=left|Yury Shuvalov
|align=left|Union of Right Forces
|
|11.78%
|-
|style="background-color:"|
|align=left|Mikhail Boyarsky
|align=left|Independent
|
|9.42%
|-
|style="background-color:#FCCA19"|
|align=left|Vladimir Prudnikov
|align=left|Congress of Russian Communities-Yury Boldyrev Movement
|
|5.86%
|-
|style="background-color:"|
|align=left|Yevgeny Nikolsky
|align=left|Independent
|
|4.13%
|-
|style="background-color:"|
|align=left|Sergey Kolesnik
|align=left|Independent
|
|2.63%
|-
|style="background-color:"|
|align=left|Yury Zheludkov
|align=left|Liberal Democratic Party
|
|1.74%
|-
|style="background-color:#020266"|
|align=left|Boris Vasilyev
|align=left|Russian Socialist Party
|
|1.73%
|-
|style="background-color:"|
|align=left|Lyudmila Poddubskaya
|align=left|Independent
|
|1.59%
|-
|style="background-color:"|
|align=left|Viktor Sokolov
|align=left|Independent
|
|1.19%
|-
|style="background-color:"|
|align=left|Andrey Stepanov
|align=left|Our Home – Russia
|
|0.96%
|-
|style="background-color:#084284"|
|align=left|Yury Nikolayenko
|align=left|Spiritual Heritage
|
|0.53%
|-
|style="background-color:#000000"|
|colspan=2 |against all
|
|15.44%
|-
| colspan="5" style="background-color:#E9E9E9;"|
|- style="font-weight:bold"
| colspan="3" style="text-align:left;" | Total
| 
| 100%
|-
| colspan="5" style="background-color:#E9E9E9;"|
|- style="font-weight:bold"
| colspan="4" |Source:
|
|}

2000

|-
! colspan=2 style="background-color:#E9E9E9;text-align:left;vertical-align:top;" |Candidate
! style="background-color:#E9E9E9;text-align:left;vertical-align:top;" |Party
! style="background-color:#E9E9E9;text-align:right;" |Votes
! style="background-color:#E9E9E9;text-align:right;" |%
|-
|style="background-color:"|
|align=left|Konstantin Sevenard
|align=left|Independent
|
|21.39%
|-
|style="background-color:"|
|align=left|Anatoly Golov
|align=left|Independent
|
|20.25%
|-
|style="background-color:"|
|align=left|Said Tulakov
|align=left|Independent
|
|12.55%
|-
|style="background-color:"|
|align=left|Aleksey Vorontsov
|align=left|Independent
|
|8.43%
|-
|style="background-color:"|
|align=left|Aleksandr Neshitov
|align=left|Independent
|
|3.56%
|-
|style="background-color:"|
|align=left|Olga Borisova
|align=left|Independent
|
|3.06%
|-
|style="background-color:"|
|align=left|Yury Shutov
|align=left|Independent
|
|1.92%
|-
|style="background-color:"|
|align=left|Natalya Belotskaya
|align=left|Independent
|
|1.38%
|-
|style="background-color:"|
|align=left|Anatoly Kontashev
|align=left|Independent
|
|1.03%
|-
|style="background-color:"|
|align=left|Aleksandr Tsvetkov
|align=left|Independent
|
|0.78%
|-
|style="background-color:"|
|align=left|Valery Nitetsky
|align=left|Independent
|
|0.72%
|-
|style="background-color:"|
|align=left|Vladimir Savitsky
|align=left|Independent
|
|0.72%
|-
|style="background-color:"|
|align=left|Andrey Rozhdestvensky
|align=left|Independent
|
|0.71%
|-
|style="background-color:"|
|align=left|Viktor Makarov
|align=left|Independent
|
|0.56%
|-
|style="background-color:"|
|align=left|Lyudmila Bespalova
|align=left|Independent
|
|0.56%
|-
|style="background-color:"|
|align=left|Teymuraz Avaliani
|align=left|Independent
|
|0.55%
|-
|style="background-color:"|
|align=left|Yury Abanin
|align=left|Independent
|
|0.45%
|-
|style="background-color:"|
|align=left|Yevgeny Pudovkin
|align=left|Independent
|
|0.44%
|-
|style="background-color:"|
|align=left|Yevgeny Zverev
|align=left|Independent
|
|0.43%
|-
|style="background-color:"|
|align=left|Nikolay Bondarik
|align=left|Independent
|
|0.42%
|-
|style="background-color:"|
|align=left|Vyacheslav Marychev
|align=left|Independent
|
|0.34%
|-
|style="background-color:"|
|align=left|Vasily Terentyev
|align=left|Independent
|
|0.27%
|-
|style="background-color:"|
|align=left|Viktor Gladkikh
|align=left|Independent
|
|0.15%
|-
|style="background-color:"|
|align=left|Andrey Melnichuk
|align=left|Independent
|
|0.12%
|-
|style="background-color:"|
|align=left|Aleksandr Bakayev
|align=left|Independent
|
|0.11%
|-
|style="background-color:#000000"|
|colspan=2 |against all
|
|17.25%
|-
| colspan="5" style="background-color:#E9E9E9;"|
|- style="font-weight:bold"
| colspan="3" style="text-align:left;" | Total
| 
| 100%
|-
| colspan="5" style="background-color:#E9E9E9;"|
|- style="font-weight:bold"
| colspan="4" |Source:
|
|}

2003

|-
! colspan=2 style="background-color:#E9E9E9;text-align:left;vertical-align:top;" |Candidate
! style="background-color:#E9E9E9;text-align:left;vertical-align:top;" |Party
! style="background-color:#E9E9E9;text-align:right;" |Votes
! style="background-color:#E9E9E9;text-align:right;" |%
|-
|style="background-color:"|
|align=left|Andrey Shevelyov
|align=left|United Russia
|
|19.19%
|-
|style="background-color:"|
|align=left|Anatoly Krivenchenko
|align=left|Rodina
|
|15.07%
|-
|style="background-color:"|
|align=left|Anatoly Golov
|align=left|Yabloko
|
|13.92%
|-
|style="background-color:#1042A5"|
|align=left|Sergey Gulyayev
|align=left|Union of Right Forces
|
|11.01%
|-
|style="background-color:"|
|align=left|Georgy Alyev
|align=left|Independent
|
|8.16%
|-
|style="background-color:"|
|align=left|Pavel Dashkov
|align=left|Independent
|
|6.45%
|-
|style="background-color:#00A1FF"|
|align=left|Sergey Vostretsov
|align=left|Party of Russia's Rebirth-Russian Party of Life
|
|3.43%
|-
|style="background-color:"|
|align=left|Taras Komissarov
|align=left|Liberal Democratic Party
|
|2.84%
|-
|style="background-color:"|
|align=left|Igor Morozov
|align=left|Independent
|
|1.58%
|-
|style="background-color:"|
|align=left|Vladimir Romantsov
|align=left|Independent
|
|1.39%
|-
|style="background-color:"|
|align=left|Sergey Pryanishnikov
|align=left|Independent
|
|1.18%
|-
|style="background-color:#164C8C"|
|align=left|Vladimir Kirkin
|align=left|United Russian Party Rus'
|
|0.61%
|-
|style="background-color:#000000"|
|colspan=2 |against all
|
|14.27%
|-
| colspan="5" style="background-color:#E9E9E9;"|
|- style="font-weight:bold"
| colspan="3" style="text-align:left;" | Total
| 
| 100%
|-
| colspan="5" style="background-color:#E9E9E9;"|
|- style="font-weight:bold"
| colspan="4" |Source:
|
|}

2016

|-
! colspan=2 style="background-color:#E9E9E9;text-align:left;vertical-align:top;" |Candidate
! style="background-color:#E9E9E9;text-align:leftt;vertical-align:top;" |Party
! style="background-color:#E9E9E9;text-align:right;" |Votes
! style="background-color:#E9E9E9;text-align:right;" |%
|-
| style="background-color: " |
|align=left|Vladimir Katenev
|align=left|United Russia
|
|29.53%
|-
|style="background-color:"|
|align=left|Oleg Nilov
|align=left|A Just Russia
|
|18.33%
|-
|style="background-color:"|
|align=left|Irina Ivanova
|align=left|Communist Party
|
|11.23%
|-
|style="background:"| 
|align=left|Anatoly Golov
|align=left|Yabloko
|
|10.79%
|-
|style="background-color:"|
|align=left|Oleg Lavrov
|align=left|Liberal Democratic Party
|
|8.82%
|-
|style="background:"| 
|align=left|Andrey Krutov
|align=left|Party of Growth
|
|7.61%
|-
|style="background:"| 
|align=left|Oleg Maksakov
|align=left|People's Freedom Party
|
|2.52%
|-
|style="background-color:"|
|align=left|Aleksandr Novikov
|align=left|The Greens
|
|2.46%
|-
|style="background-color:"|
|align=left|Mikhail Starodubtsev
|align=left|Patriots of Russia
|
|1.87%
|-
|style="background:"| 
|align=left|Aleksandr Privalov
|align=left|Communists of Russia
|
|1.80%
|-
|style="background:"| 
|align=left|Olga Popova
|align=left|Civic Platform
|
|1.29%
|-
| colspan="5" style="background-color:#E9E9E9;"|
|- style="font-weight:bold"
| colspan="3" style="text-align:left;" | Total
| 
| 100%
|-
| colspan="5" style="background-color:#E9E9E9;"|
|- style="font-weight:bold"
| colspan="4" |Source:
|
|}

2021

|-
! colspan=2 style="background-color:#E9E9E9;text-align:left;vertical-align:top;" |Candidate
! style="background-color:#E9E9E9;text-align:left;vertical-align:top;" |Party
! style="background-color:#E9E9E9;text-align:right;" |Votes
! style="background-color:#E9E9E9;text-align:right;" |%
|-
|style="background-color: " |
|align=left|Nikolay Tsed
|align=left|United Russia
|
|33.34%
|-
|style="background-color:"|
|align=left|Oleg Nilov
|align=left|A Just Russia — For Truth
|
|23.64%
|-
|style="background-color:"|
|align=left|Vyacheslav Borodenchik
|align=left|Communist Party
|
|9.46%
|-
|style="background-color: "|
|align=left|Diana Ageyeva
|align=left|New People
|
|5.78%
|-
|style="background-color: "|
|align=left|Olga Yakovleva
|align=left|Party of Growth
|
|4.10%
|-
|style="background-color: "|
|align=left|Stanislav Andrusov
|align=left|Party of Pensioners
|
|3.86%
|-
|style="background-color:"|
|align=left|Aleksey Gorlanov
|align=left|Liberal Democratic Party
|
|3.79%
|-
|style="background-color:"|
|align=left|Yury Karpenko
|align=left|Yabloko
|
|3.78%
|-
|style="background-color:"|
|align=left|Veronika Klinovitskaya
|align=left|Communists of Russia
|
|2.89%
|-
|style="background-color:"|
|align=left|Vsevolod Kuptsov
|align=left|Russian Party of Freedom and Justice
|
|1.80%
|-
|style="background-color:"|
|align=left|Aleksandr Kolos
|align=left|Rodina
|
|1.71%
|-
|style="background-color:"|
|align=left|Sergey Soloshenko
|align=left|Green Alternative
|
|1.69%
|-
|style="background:"| 
|align=left|Igor Markov
|align=left|Civic Platform
|
|0.92%
|-
| colspan="5" style="background-color:#E9E9E9;"|
|- style="font-weight:bold"
| colspan="3" style="text-align:left;" | Total
| 
| 100%
|-
| colspan="5" style="background-color:#E9E9E9;"|
|- style="font-weight:bold"
| colspan="4" |Source:
|
|}

Notes

References

Russian legislative constituencies
Politics of Saint Petersburg